Barbara Marie Honchak (born August 30, 1979) is a retired American professional female mixed martial artist. She is the first Invicta FC Flyweight Champion. She has four wins in the Invicta FC promotion and holds notable victories over Vanessa Porto, Roxanne Modafferi, Leslie Smith and Felice Herrig.

Background
Honchak grew up in Edwardsville, Illinois and has one sister, Tammy. In her youth, Barb loved outdoor activities like horseback riding, scuba diving and camping. She went to Edwardsville High School, where she graduated in 1997. Then she earned an associate degree from Lewis & Clark Community College. She has a bachelor's degree in molecular biology from Western Washington University and her Master's in Ecological Genetics from Northern Arizona University. She is married to her husband, Timm.

After receiving her degrees, she moved back to Midwest because of her fiancée's career, and started training Brazilian jiu-jitsu for self-defense under Steve Berger at the age of 26. From there on, she quickly took an amateur mixed martial arts bout and was hooked to the sport.

Mixed martial arts career
Honchak went 8–1 as an amateur mixed martial artist and made her professional debut on November 28, 2009.

In her fourth professional fight, Honchak defeated Felice Herrig at Hoosier FC 6 on January 14, 2011.

Honchak won three more fights in 2011, defeating Amber McAvoy and Nina Ansaroff by decision and Roxanne Modafferi by submission due to a rear-naked choke.

Invicta Fighting Championships
As the first bout of her three-fight contract, Honchak made her Invicta Fighting Championships debut on July 28, 2012 at Invicta FC 2: Baszler vs. McMann. She defeated Bethany Marshall by TKO in the second round.

On October 28, 2012, Honchak faced Aisling Daly at Invicta FC 3: Penne vs. Sugiyama. She defeated Daly by unanimous decision.

The victory over Daly earned Honchak a shot at the inaugural Invicta FC Flyweight title on April 5, 2013 at Invicta FC 5: Penne vs. Waterson. She defeated Vanessa Porto by unanimous decision to become the first Invicta FC Flyweight Champion.

Honchak faced Leslie Smith at Invicta FC 7: Honchak vs. Smith on December 7, 2013. She successfully defended her Invicta FC title, winning via unanimous decision. The bout earned both fighters the Fight of the Night honors.

Honchak faced Takayo Hashi at Invicta FC 9 on November 1, 2014 and successfully defended her title with another unanimous decision victory. As a result of relocating, she had problems finding a team to train in, which in turn led to the stripping of her title due to inactivity.

The Ultimate Fighter
In August 2017, it was announced that after a few years away from the sport Honchak would be one of the fighters featured on The Ultimate Fighter 26, where the process to crown the UFC's inaugural 125-pound Women's Champion will take place.

In the first round, Honchak defeated Gillian Robertson via TKO in the second round, allowing her to move on to the next stage of the competition. In the quarterfinals, Honchak faced Rachael Ostovich-Berdon and won the fight by unanimous decision after two rounds. In the semifinals, Honchak faced Nicco Montaño. She lost the fight via unanimous decision after three rounds.

Ultimate Fighting Championship 
Honchak was scheduled to face Roxanne Modafferi on December 1, 2017 at The Ultimate Fighter 26 Finale. However, on the day of the weigh in, Sijara Eubanks was pulled from the fight for kidney failure while trying to make weight and she was replaced by Modafferi to face Nicco Montaño. Honchak instead faced Lauren Murphy. She lost the back-and-forth fight by split decision.

The rematch between Honchak and Roxanne Modafferi was rescheduled to take place July 6, 2018 at UFC TUF 27 Finale. Honchak lost the fight via technical knockout in round two.

Honchak was released by the UFC in August 2018. She has retired since.

Championships and accomplishments

Mixed martial arts
 Invicta FC
 Flyweight Championship (One time; first; former)
 Two Successful Title Defenses
 Fight of the Night (One Time) vs. Leslie Smith
 Women's MMA Awards
 2013 Fighter of the Year
 2013 Flyweight of the Year
 AwakeningFighters.com WMMA Awards
 2013 Flyweight of the Year

Mixed martial arts record

|-
|Loss
|align=center| 10–4
|Roxanne Modafferi
|TKO (elbows)
|The Ultimate Fighter: Undefeated Finale 
|
|align=center|2
|align=center|3:32
|Las Vegas, Nevada, United States
|
|- 
|Loss
|align=center| 10–3
|Lauren Murphy
|Decision (split)
|The Ultimate Fighter: A New World Champion Finale 
|
|align=center|3
|align=center|5:00
|Las Vegas, Nevada, United States
|
|-
| Win
| align=center | 10–2
| Takayo Hashi
| Decision (unanimous)
| Invicta FC 9: Honchak vs. Hashi
| 
| align=center | 5
| align=center | 5:00
| Davenport, Iowa, United States
| 
|-
| Win
| align=center | 9–2
| Leslie Smith
| Decision (unanimous)
| Invicta FC 7: Honchak vs. Smith
| 
| align=center | 5
| align=center | 5:00
| Kansas City, Missouri, United States
| 
|-
| Win
| align=center | 8–2
| Vanessa Porto
| Decision (unanimous)
| Invicta FC 5: Penne vs. Waterson
| 
| align=center | 5
| align=center | 5:00
| Kansas City, Missouri, United States
| 
|-
| Win
| align=center | 7–2
| Aisling Daly
| Decision (unanimous)
| Invicta FC 3: Penne vs. Sugiyama
| 
| align=center | 3
| align=center | 5:00
| Kansas City, Kansas, United States
|
|-
| Win
| align=center | 6–2
| Bethany Marshall
| TKO (punches)
| Invicta FC 2: Baszler vs. McMann
| 
| align=center | 2
| align=center | 1:22
| Kansas City, Kansas, United States
|
|-
| Win
| align=center | 5–2
| Roxanne Modafferi
| Submission (rear-naked choke)
| BEP 5: Breast Cancer Beatdown
| 
| align=center | 3
| align=center | 1:46
| Fletcher, North Carolina, United States
|
|-
| Win
| align=center | 4–2
| Nina Ansaroff
| Decision (unanimous)
| Crowbar MMA: Spring Brawl 2
| 
| align=center | 3
| align=center | 5:00
| Fargo, North Dakota, United States
|
|-
| Win
| align=center | 3–2
| Amber McAvoy
| Decision (unanimous)
| WC: Wright Fights 2
| 
| align=center | 3
| align=center | 5:00
| St. Charles, Missouri, United States
|
|-
| Win
| align=center | 2–2
| Felice Herrig
| Decision (unanimous)
| Hoosier FC 6: New Years Nemesis
| 
| align=center | 3
| align=center | 5:00
| Valparaiso, Indiana, United States
|
|-
| Loss
| align=center | 1–2
| Angela Magaña
| Decision (split)
| Ultimate Women Challenge
| 
| align=center | 3
| align=center | 5:00
| St George, Utah, United States
|
|-
| Loss
| align=center | 1–1
| Cat Zingano
| Decision (unanimous)
| Fight to Win: Phenoms
| 
| align=center | 3
| align=center | 5:00
| Denver, Colorado, United States
|
|-
| Win
| align=center | 1–0
| Monica Lovato
| Submission (rear-naked choke)
| KOTC: Horse Power
| 
| align=center | 2
| align=center | 3:58
| Mescalero, New Mexico, United States
|

Mixed martial arts exhibition record

|-
| Loss
| align=center | 2–1
| Nicco Montaño
| Decision (unanimous)
|rowspan=3| The Ultimate Fighter: A New World Champion
|  (air date)
| align=Center | 3
| align=center  | 5:00
|rowspan=3| Las Vegas, Nevada, United States
| 
|-
|-
| Win
| align=center | 2–0
| Rachael Ostovich-Berdon
| Decision (unanimous)
|  (air date)
| align=Center | 2
| align=center  | 5:00
| 
|-
| Win
| align=center | 1–0
| Gillian Robertson
| TKO (punches and elbows)
|  (air date)
| align=center | 2
| align=center | 2:27
|

See also
 List of current mixed martial arts champions
 List of female mixed martial artists

References

External links
 
 Barb Honchak at Invicta FC
 
 Barb Honchak at AwakeningFighters.com

1979 births
Living people
People from Edwardsville, Illinois
American female mixed martial artists
Flyweight mixed martial artists
Mixed martial artists utilizing Brazilian jiu-jitsu
Mixed martial artists from Illinois
People from High Ridge, Missouri
American practitioners of Brazilian jiu-jitsu
Female Brazilian jiu-jitsu practitioners
21st-century American women